Eubranchus productus is a species of sea slug or nudibranch, a marine gastropod mollusc in the family Eubranchidae.

Distribution
This species was described from the Gulf of Mannar, Ceylon.

References

 Edmunds M. & Kress A. (1969). On the European species of Eubranchus (Mollusca: Opisthobranchia). Journal of the Marine Biological Association of the United Kingdom. 49(4): 879-912 page(s): 907

Eubranchidae
Gastropods described in 1905